Baron Ebbisham, of Cobham in the County of Surrey, was a title in the Peerage of the United Kingdom. It was created on 5 July 1928 for the businessman and Conservative politician Sir Rowland Blades, 1st Baronet. He had already been created a Baronet, of Epsom in the County of Surrey, in the Baronetage of the United Kingdom on 14 January 1922. The titles became extinct upon the death of his son, the second Baron, in 1991.

Barons Ebbisham (1928)
(George) Rowland Blades, 1st Baron Ebbisham (1868–1953) 
Rowland Roberts Blades, 2nd Baron Ebbisham (1912–1991)

References

Extinct baronies in the Peerage of the United Kingdom
Noble titles created in 1928
Noble titles created for UK MPs